Al Ittihad Bridge is a proposed 12-lane bridge across Dubai Creek in Dubai. The Bridge will connect Bur Dubai from near the Dubai Courts and Dubai Creek Park and Deira near Deira City Centre and Dubai Golf Club. It will replace the current Floating Bridge.  Shaikh Mohammad Bin Rashid Al Maktoum, Vice-President and Prime Minister of the UAE and Ruler of Dubai reviewed the project on 30 June 2013. The project cost is estimated to be Dh1.1 billion. Contract for the construction is expected to be awarded by end of 2014 and construction works to be completed in 3 years.

It will have 6 lanes and a footpath in both directions. The crossing can accommodate around 24,000 vehicles per hour. On the Bur Dubai side the bridge will also connect with a new underpass near Rashid Hospital, while on the Deira side it will be linked with Al Ittihad Road for motorists travelling to Sharjah.

The project is scheduled for opening in early 2018.

Timing 
The Al Ittihad Bridge was originally announced on November 15, 2008 nicknamed Dubai Smile, and also referred to as Seventh Crossing. The cost then estimated was Dh810 million and construction was originally expected to be complete by 2012. Khaleej Times on 7 August 2012 reported that the Dubai Smile will be open for traffic in the middle of 2013. This was later revised to late 2018, since postponed. 

It was announced on November 6, 2009 that the Floating Bridge will stay till 2014. It is still in operation as of 2021.

See also
 Sheikh Rashid bin Saeed Crossing
 List of bridges and tunnels in Dubai

References

External links
 Dubaichronicle.com
 Gulfnews.com
 The Dubai Smile is no bridge too far

Bridges in Dubai
Proposed bridges in the United Arab Emirates
Through arch bridges